Chrysocale regalis is a moth of the subfamily Arctiinae. It was described by Jean Baptiste Boisduval in 1836. It is found in Ecuador and Bolivia.

References

Euchromiina
Moths described in 1836